Kwak Ji-kyoon (born Kwak Jung-kyoon, November 10, 1954 – May 25, 2010) was a South Korean film director and screenwriter. Kwak made his directorial debut in 1986 with the film Winter Wanderer, and later directed Portrait of the Days of Youth (1991) and Plum Blossom (2000). He committed suicide on May 25, 2010, after suffering from depression for 10 years.

Filmography 
So Close Yet Far (1978) - assistant director
When Sadness Takes Over a Wave (1978) - assistant director
Yeosu (The Loneliness of the Journey) (1979) - assistant director
Tomorrow After Tomorrow (1979) - assistant director
The Divine Bow (1979) - assistant director
Mrs. Speculator (1980) - assistant director
The Hidden Hero (1980) - assistant director
Mandala (1981) - assistant director
Tears of the Idol (1982) - assistant director
As Firm As A Stone (1983) - assistant director
Deep Blue Night (1985) - assistant director
Deer Hunting (1985) - screenwriter
Winter Wanderer (1986) - director 
The Home of Two Women (1987) - director, screenwriter
Wound (1989) - director
Long After That (1989) - director
Portrait of the Days of Youth (1991) - director
The Woman Who Won't Divorce (1992) - director
Rosy Days (1994) - director
Deep Blue (1997) - director
Plum Blossom (2000) - director, screenwriter
Fly High (2006) - director, screenwriter

Awards 
1986 6th Korean Association of Film Critics Awards: Best New Director (Winter Wanderer)
1991 29th Grand Bell Awards: Best Director (Portrait of the Days of Youth)

References

External links 
 
 
 

1954 births
2010 deaths
South Korean film directors
South Korean screenwriters